Heather Thompson could refer to: 

Heather Ann Thompson, American historian
Heather Dawn Thompson, Native American lawyer

See also
Heather Thomson (disambiguation)